Senator Vogel may refer to:

Carl M. Vogel (1955–2016), Missouri State Senate
Elder Vogel (born 1956), Pennsylvania State Senate
Jill Vogel (born 1970), Virginia State Senate